BugMeNot is an Internet service that provides usernames and passwords to let Internet users bypass mandatory free registration on websites. It was started in August 2003 by an anonymous person, later revealed to be Guy King, and allowed Internet users to access websites that have registration walls (for instance, that of The New York Times) with the requirement of compulsory registration. This came in response to the increasing number of websites that request such registration, which many Internet users find to be an annoyance and a potential source of email spam.

Use of the service
BugMeNot allows users of their service to add new accounts for sites with free registration. It also encourages users to use disposable email address services to create such accounts. However, it does not allow them to add accounts for paid websites, as this could potentially  lead to credit card fraud. BugMeNot also claims to remove accounts for any website requesting that they do not provide accounts for non-registered users.

To help make access to their service easier, BugMeNot hosts a bookmarklet that can be used with any browser to automatically find a usable account from their service. They also host extensions for the web browsers Mozilla Firefox (but not on Firefox quantum yet), Internet Explorer, and Google Chrome (the extensions were created by Eric Hamiter with Dmytri Kleiner and Dean Wilson, respectively). There are also implementations in the form of a BugMeNot Opera widget, or UserJS scripts along with buttons, which makes it fully browser-integrated. An Android application is also available.

Opting out 

BugMeNot provides an option for site owners to block their site from the BugMeNot database, if they match one or more of the following criteria:

 A community site where users register to change content, but not to view it (example: Wikipedia)
 The site is pay-per-view
 There is a fraud risk associated with the site due to accounts containing private financial information

No option is provided for users to request removing a block if a site ceases to meet the blocking criteria or has never met them in the first place.

Site blocking can be circumvented by BugMeNot users by publishing usernames and passwords under a similar, but different, domain name to which they apply. For example, the owners of the domain abc.def.com might request a block to be put in place, but this will not prevent users uploading access information under the name of def.abc.com. Since one domain owner cannot demand that another domain be blocked, the information remains and is accessible provided that BugMeNot users tacitly agree that def.abc.com in fact refers to abc.def.com. For example, Wikipedia logins are in the database under wikipedia.net because wikipedia.com and wikipedia.org have been banned under the first criterion.

Temporary shutdown and return 
Nearly a year after it was created BugMeNot was shut down temporarily by their service provider (at that time) HostGator. The site's creator claimed BugMeNot's host was pressured by websites to shut them down, though Hostgator claimed that the BugMeNot site was repeatedly crashing their servers.

The BugMeNot domain was transferred briefly to another hosting company, dissidenthosting.com, but before the site was set up, it began to redirect visitors to web pages belonging to racist groups, without the knowledge or consent of the site's owner. BugMeNot moved again, to NearlyFreeSpeech.NET. BugMeNot's move to this provider, which also hosts a number of highly controversial sites, prompted BugMeNot's creator to say, "Personally, I don't care if I'm sharing a server with neo-Nazis. I might not agree with what they have to say, but the whole thing about freedom of speech is that people are free to speak."

Shortly after BugMeNot returned, reports surfaced that some news sites had begun to attempt to block accounts posted on BugMeNot, though the extent and effectiveness of such efforts, as well as compliance with BugMeNot's Terms of Use, are not known.

RetailMeNot
The operators of BugMeNot expanded the "MeNot" network in October, 2006 with the addition of RetailMeNot – a service for finding and sharing online coupon codes.  Users can add coupons they have found through any method, as well as a description of the coupon and an expiration date. Users can also scan in printed coupons and upload them for others to print.

References 

Delio, Michelle. "Building a Better Mozilla". Wired magazine. July 7, 2004.
Newcomb, Kevin. "Host: Big Traffic, Not Big Media Responsible for Bugmenot Shutdown". Clickz Network. August 24, 2004.
"Bugmenot Faq ". April 26, 2006.

External links 
 

Internet properties established in 2003
Online databases